The TEMPUS (Trans-European Mobility Programme for University Studies) program encouraged higher education institutions in the EU Member States and partner countries to engage in structured cooperation through the establishment of "consortia". The "consortia" implemented Joint European Projects (JEPs) with a clear set of objectives. Such projects could receive financial aid for two or three years. Tempus also provided Individual Mobility Grants (IMGs) to individuals working in Higher Education sector to help them work on certain specified activities in other countries.

As of 1 January 2014, Tempus-like activities, namely capacity building activities, became part of a new cooperation programme called Erasmus+. These activities involve former Tempus member countries, in addition to countries from Latin America, Asia and Africa, the Caribbean and the Pacific.

Member states
Participating countries of TEMPUS included:

 The 27 member states of the European Union.

Partnership countries (organized by region) include:

Europe:

Asia:

Central Asia:

Africa:

 (under negotiations)

Example projects
 Tambov State Technical University's Centre for International Specialist Training (CIST) runs a specialist training course, "English for Students, Lecturers and Administrators of Technical Universities", developed within the framework of TEMPUS.
 According to 2013 figures of the Minister of Education between 1993 and 2013 40% of Ukrainian higher education establishments have participated in TEMPUS projects. In 2008, TEMPUS opened offices in both Jerusalem and Ramallah.

See also

 Bologna Process
 European Higher Education Area
 European Research Area
 Erasmus Programme

References

Further reading
 Ayoubi, R.M. and Massoud, H. K. (2011). "Questioning the Role of Internationalization in the Nationalization of Higher Education: the Impact of the EU TEMPUS Programme on Higher Education in Syria", European Journal of Higher Education, Vol 1, Issue 4, pp. 352–368. (Taylor and Francis, indexed by ERA)

External links
TEMPUS website of the European Commission

Academic transfer
Educational policies and initiatives of the European Union